"Best Friends" is a song by singer Sophia Grace of the British duo Sophia Grace & Rosie. It was released to all streaming platforms on November 30, 2014. It was written by Dominic Brownlee and Hi W. Jackson, and produced by Donald Sales and Da Beatfreakz. The music video was released on January 7, 2015. The song debuted at number 87 on the Billboard Hot 100.

Background and composition 
In November 2014, Grace announced the track was available to download on iTunes. It was eventually released on November 30 to all social media platforms. The song is a bubblegum pop and pop rap single that is marketed towards children. It contains heavy production grounded by elements of synth, bass, snaps, and hi-hats, among other sounds. Sophia sings about being committed to friendship and leadership, having a "best friend that has your back", disbanding and "shutting down stupid boys", singing in the first verse, rapping in the second verse, and doing both in the third verse.

Grace spoke with Ryan Seacrest about the track.

Reception 
Many writers and listeners were surprised by the performance coming from the 11-year-old singer, with Liam Dryden of PopBuzz stating, "There's no denying the song's a banger, but it feels like a whole other thing when you realize the singer is 11 years old and looks as though she's been lifted straight out of an ad for Lelli Kelly shoes". Singer-songwriter Katy Perry even expressed her approval of the record on Twitter. On January 7, she wrote "If Sophia Grace plays her new trap hit at Coachella, I'll go." and in a now-deleted tweet, "[This song] goes hard as fuck."

In the United States, "Best Friends" debuted at number 87 on the Billboard Hot 100 on week ending January 24, 2015, becoming Grace's first ever entry on the chart.

Music video 
On November 14, 2014, a trailer for the song's music video was posted, along with a behind the scenes video on December 16. The full video was eventually released on January 7, 2015. It showcases Grace and other actors portraying her "best friends" in different scenes. One dancing in a bedroom, hopping on a bed, another one shopping together at a Kmart for outfits and toys before returning home to try their outfits and makeup on, and the last one dancing on a stage. Short clips of Sophia dancing and singing in front of a sunset are also included. The video was directed by Matt Alonzo. It currently sits at over 91 million views.

Charts

References 

2014 songs
2014 singles